Eimeldingen is a municipality in the district of Lörrach, in Baden-Württemberg, Germany.

References

Municipalities in Baden-Württemberg
Lörrach (district)
Baden